Nokia 5130 XpressMusic is a mobile phone manufactured by Nokia. It belongs to the XpressMusic series of phones, and runs on Nokia's Series 40 platform.

Main features
The phone's Series 40 (S40) platform is Java MIDP 2.0 and Adobe Flash Lite 3.0 enabled. The phone has  a 320x240 resolution screen and a physical alphanumeric type keypad. There is a rear-facing 2.0 megapixel camera that supports still imaging and video recording. Music player supports MP3, AAC, WMA, WAV, AMR and a few other formats. The phone has a built-in Opera Mini browser and Windows Live support for instant messaging.

References

External links 
Nokia's official specifications page

NOKIA 5130 XpressMusic Hard Reset information 

5130
Mobile phones with user-replaceable battery
Mobile phones introduced in 2009